Julie Fisher may refer to:

Julie D. Fisher, American diplomat
Julie Montagu, Viscountess Hinchingbrooke (born Julie Jean Fisher, 1972), American blogger and television personality

See also
Joely Fisher (born 1967), American actress and singer
Julia Fischer (born 1983), German classical violinist and pianist
Julia Martz-Fisher (born 1968), American jurist
Jules Fisher (born 1937), American lighting designer
Jules G. Fisher (1874–1943), Louisiana politician